Cyclostrema quadricarinatum is a species of sea snail, a marine gastropod mollusk in the family Liotiidae.

Description
(Original description by Melvill & Standen) The height of the shell attains 1 mm and its diameter 2.25 mm. The solid, depressed shell is umbilicated. The shell is highly sculptured with a minute angle. It contains 3½ whorls with the upper whorl minute. The body whorl is larger in proportion, four-keeled and with acute carinae. With the aid of a lens the surface is seen to be longitudinally extremely shagreened or striate. The peristome is continuous, six-angled externally. The aperture is round. The operculum is present, horny and multispiral. The nearest ally, Circulus smithi Bush, 1897 (synonym: Cyclostrema trlcarinata Smith), from West Africa, we have compared with our species. There is some affinity, but, as its name implies, that species is but three-angled and is likewise radiately lirate.

Distribution
This species occurs in the Gulf of Oman.

References

 Trew, A., 1984. The Melvill-Tomlin Collection. Part 30. Trochacea. Handlists of the Molluscan Collections in the Department of Zoology, National Museum of Wales.

External links
 To World Register of Marine Species

quadricarinatum
Gastropods described in 1901